Signal transducer and activator of transcription 6 (STAT6) is a transcription factor that belongs to the Signal Transducer and Activator of Transcription (STAT) family of proteins. The proteins of STAT family transmit signals from a receptor complex to the nucleus and activate gene expression. Similarly as other STAT family proteins, STAT6 is also activated by growth factors and cytokines. STAT6 is mainly activated by cytokines interleukin-4 and interleukin-13.

Molecular biology 

In the human genome, STAT6 protein is encoded by the STAT6 gene, located on the chromosome 12q13.3-q14.1. The gene encompasses over 19 kb and consists of 23 exons. STAT6 shares structural similarity with the other STAT proteins and is composed of the N-terminal domain, DNA binding domain, SH3- like domain, SH2 domain and transactivation domain (TAD).

STAT proteins are activated by the Janus family (JAKs) tyrosine kinases in response to cytokine exposure. STAT6 is activated by cytokines interleukin-4 (IL-4), and interleukin-13 (IL-13) with their receptors that both contain the α subunit of the IL-4 receptor (IL-4Rα). Tyrosine phosporylation of STAT6 after stimulation by IL-4 results in the formation of STAT6 homodimers that bind specific DNA elements via a DNA-binding domain.

Function 
STAT6-mediated signaling pathway is required for the development of T-helper type 2 (Th2) cells and Th2 immune response. Expression of Th2 cytokines, including IL-4, IL-13, and IL-5, was reduced in STAT6 - / - mice. STAT 6 protein is crucial in IL4 mediated biological responses. It was found that STAT6 induce the expression of BCL2L1/BCL-X(L), which is responsible for the anti-apoptotic activity of IL4. IL-4 stimulates the phosphorylation of IL-4 receptor, which recruits cytosolic STAT6 by its SH2 domain and STAT6 is phosphorylated on tyrosine 641 (Y641) by JAK1, which results in the dimerization and nuclear translocation of STAT6 to activate target genes. Knockout studies in mice suggested the roles of this gene in differentiation of T helper 2 (Th2), expression of cell surface markers, and class switch of immunoglobulins.

Activation of STAT6 signaling pathway is necessary in macrophage function, and is required for the M2 subtype activation of macrophages. STAT6 protein also regulates other transcription factor as Gata3, which is important regulator of Th2 differentiation. STAT6 is also required for the development of IL-9-secreting T cells.

STAT6 is also involved in IL4 signaling in B cells, and STAT6 determines the levels of CD20 on the surface of normal and malignant B lymphocytes.

STAT6 also plays a critical role in Th2 lung inflammatory responses including clearance of parasitic infections and in the pathogenesis of asthma.   Th2-cell derived cytokines as IL-4 and IL-13 induce the production of IgE which is  a major mediator in allergic response.  Association studies searching for relation of polymorphisms in STAT6 with IgE level or asthma discovered a few polymorphisms significantly associated with examined traits. Only two polymorphisms showed repeatedly significant clinical association and/or functional effect on STAT6 function (GT repeats in exon 1 and rs324011 polymorphism in intron 2).

Interactions 

STAT6 has been shown to interact with:
 CREB-binding protein, 
 EP300, 
 IRF4, 
 NFKB1, 
 Nuclear receptor coactivator 1,  and
 SND1.

Pathology
Gene fusion
 Recurrent somatic fusions of the two genes, NGFI-A–binding protein 2 (NAB2) and STAT6, located at chromosomal region 12q13, have been identified in solitary fibrous tumors.
Amplification
STAT6 is amplified in a subset of dedifferentiated liposarcoma.

See also 
 Interleukin 4

References

Further reading

External links 
 

Gene expression
Immune system
Proteins
Transcription factors
Signal transduction